Léopold Sédar Senghor (9 October 1906 – 20 December 2001) was a Senegalese poet, politician and cultural theorist who was the first president of Senegal (1960–80).

Ideologically an African socialist, he was the major theoretician of Négritude. Senghor was a proponent of African culture, black identity and African empowerment within the framework of French-African ties. He advocated for the extension of full civil and political rights for France's African territories while arguing that French Africans would be better off within a federal French structure than as independent nation-states.

Senghor became the first President of independent Senegal. He fell out with his long-standing associate Mamadou Dia who was Prime Minister of Senegal, arresting him on suspicion of fomenting a coup and imprisoning him for 12 years. Senghor established an authoritarian single-party state in Senegal where all rival political parties were prohibited.

Senghor was also the founder of the Senegalese Democratic Bloc party. Senghor was the first African elected as a member of the Académie française. He won the 1985 International Nonino Prize in Italy. He is regarded by many as one of the most important African intellectuals of the 20th century.

Early years: 1906–28
Léopold Sédar Senghor was born on 9 October 1906 in the city of Joal, some 110 kilometres south of Dakar, capital of Senegal. His father, Basile Diogoye Senghor (pronounced: Basile Jogoy Senghor), was a wealthy peanut merchant belonging to the bourgeois Serer people. Basile Senghor was said to be a man of great means and owned thousands of cattle and vast lands, some of which were given to him by his cousin the king of Sine. Gnilane Ndiémé Bakhoum (1861–1948), Senghor's mother, the third wife of his father, a Muslim with Fula origin who belonged to the Tabor tribe, was born near Djilor to a Christian family. She gave birth to six children, including two sons. Senghor's birth certificate states that he was born on 9 October 1906; however, there is a discrepancy with his certificate of baptism, which states it occurred on 9 August 1906. His Serer middle name Sédar comes from the Serer language, meaning "one that shall not be humiliated" or "the one you cannot humiliate". His surname Senghor is a combination of the Serer words Sène (a Serer surname and the name of the Supreme Deity in Serer religion called Rog Sene) and gor or ghor, the etymology of which is kor in the Serer language, meaning male or man. Tukura Badiar Senghor, the prince of Sine and a figure from whom Léopold Sédar Senghor has been reported to trace descent, was a  Serer noble.

At the age of eight, Senghor began his studies in Senegal in the Ngasobil boarding-school of the Fathers of the Holy Spirit. In 1922 he entered a seminary in Dakar. After being told the religious life was not for him, he attended a secular institution. By then, he was already passionate about French literature. He won distinctions in French, Latin, Greek and Algebra. With his Baccalaureate completed, he was awarded a scholarship to continue his studies in France.

"Sixteen years of wandering": 1928–1944
In 1928 Senghor sailed from Senegal for France, beginning, in his words, "sixteen years of wandering." Starting his post-secondary studies at the Sorbonne, he quit and went on to the Lycée Louis-le-Grand to finish his preparatory course for entrance to the École Normale Supérieure, a grande école. Henri Queffélec, Robert Verdier and Georges Pompidou were also studying at this elite institution. After failing the entrance exam, Senghor prepared for his grammar Agrégation. He was granted his agrégation in 1935 after a failed first attempt.

Academic career
Senghor graduated from the University of Paris, where he received the Agrégation in French Grammar. Subsequently, he was designated professor at the universities of Tours and Paris, where he taught during the period 1935–45.

Senghor started his teaching years at the lycée René-Descartes in Tours; he also taught at the lycée Marcelin-Berthelot in Saint-Maur-des-Fosses near Paris. He also studied linguistics taught by Lilias Homburger at the École pratique des hautes études. He studied with prominent social scientists such as Marcel Cohen, Marcel Mauss and Paul Rivet (director of the Institut d'ethnologie de Paris). Senghor, along with other intellectuals of the African diaspora who had come to study in the colonial capital, coined the term and conceived the notion of "négritude", which was a response to the racism still prevalent in France. It turned the racial slur nègre into a positively connoted celebration of African culture and character. The idea of négritude informed not only Senghor's cultural criticism and literary work, but also became a guiding principle for his political thought in his career as a statesman.

Military service
In 1939, Senghor was enrolled as a French army enlisted man (2e Classe) with the rank of private within the 59th Colonial Infantry division in spite of his higher education and of his 1932 acquisition of the French Citizenship. A year later in 1940, during the German invasion of France, he was taken prisoner by the Germans in la Charité-sur-Loire. He was interned in different camps, and finally at Front Stalag 230, in Poitiers. Front Stalag 230 was reserved for colonial troops captured during the war. German soldiers wanted to execute him and the others the same day they were captured, but they escaped this fate by yelling Vive la France, vive l'Afrique noire! ("Long live France, long live Black Africa!") A French officer told the soldiers that executing the African prisoners would dishonour the Aryan race and the German Army. In total, Senghor spent two years in different prison camps, where he spent most of his time writing poems and learning enough German to read Goethe's poetry in the original. In 1942 he was released for medical reasons.

He resumed his teaching career while remaining involved in the resistance during the Nazi occupation.

Political career: 1945–1982

Colonial France
Senghor advocated for African integration within the French Empire, arguing that independence for small, weak territories would lead to the perpetuation of oppression, whereas African empowerment within a federal French Empire could transform it for the better.

Once the war was over, Senghor was selected as Dean of the Linguistics Department with the École nationale de la France d'Outre-Mer, a position he would hold until Senegal's independence in 1960. While travelling on a research trip for his poetry, he met the local socialist leader, Lamine Guèye, who suggested that Senghor run for election as a member of the Assemblée nationale française. Senghor accepted and became député for the riding of Sénégal-Mauritanie, when colonies were granted the right to be represented by elected individuals. They took different positions when the train conductors on the Dakar-Niger line went on strike. Guèye voted against the strike, arguing the movement would paralyse the colony, while Senghor supported the workers, which gained him great support among Senegalese.

During the negotiations to write the French Constitution of 1946, Senghor pushed for the extension of French citizenship to all French territories. Four Senegalese communes had citizenship since 1916 – Senghor argued that this should be extended to the rest of France's territory. Senghor argued for a federal model whereby each African territory would govern its own internal affairs, and this federation would be part of a larger French confederation that ran foreign affairs, defense and development policies. Senghor opposed indigenous nationalism, arguing that African territories would develop more successfully within a federal model where each territory had its "negro-African personality" along with French experience and resources.

Political changes
In 1947, Senghor left the African Division of the French Section of the Workers International (SFIO), which had given enormous financial support to the social movement. With Mamadou Dia, he founded the Bloc démocratique sénégalais (1948). They won the legislative elections of 1951, and Guèye lost his seat. Senghor was involved in the negotiations and drafting of the Fourth Republic's constitution.

Re-elected deputy in 1951 as an independent overseas member, Senghor was appointed state secretary to the council's president in Edgar Faure's government from 1 March 1955 to 1 February 1956. He became mayor of the city of Thiès, Senegal in November 1956 and then advisory minister in the Michel Debré's government from 23 July 1959 to 19 May 1961. He was also a member of the commission responsible for drafting the Fifth Republic's constitution, general councillor for Senegal, member of the Grand Conseil de l'Afrique Occidentale Francaise and member for the parliamentary assembly of the European Council.

In 1964 Senghor published the first volume of a series of five, titled Liberté. The book contains a variety of speeches, essays and prefaces.

Senegal
Senghor supported federalism for newly independent African states, a type of "French Commonwealth", while retaining a degree of French involvement:

Since federalism was not favoured by the African countries, he decided to form, along with Modibo Keita, the Mali Federation with former French Sudan (present-day Mali). Senghor was president of the Federal Assembly until its failure in 1960.

Afterwards, Senghor became the first President of the Republic of Senegal, elected on 5 September 1960. He is the author of the Senegalese national anthem. The prime minister, Mamadou Dia, was in charge of executing Senegal's long-term development plan, while Senghor was in charge of foreign relations. The two men quickly disagreed. In December 1962, Mamadou Dia was arrested under suspicion of fomenting a coup d'état. He was held in prison for 12 years. Following this, Senghor established an authoritarian presidential regime where all rival political parties were suppressed.

On 22 March 1967, Senghor survived an assassination attempt. The suspect, Moustapha Lô, pointed his pistol towards the President after he had participated in the sermon of Tabaski, but the gun did not fire. Lô was sentenced to death for treason and executed on 15 June 1967, even though it remained unclear if he had actually wanted to kill Senghor.

Following an announcement at the beginning of December 1980, Senghor resigned his position at the end of the year, before the end of his fifth term. Abdou Diouf replaced him as the head of the country. Under his presidency, Senegal adopted a multi-party system (limited to three: socialist, communist and liberal). He created a performing education system. Despite the end of official colonialism, the value of Senegalese currency continued to be fixed by France, the language of learning remained French, and Senghor ruled the country with French political advisors.

Francophonie
He supported the creation of la Francophonie and was elected vice-president of the High Council of the Francophonie. In 1982, he was one of the founders of the Association France and developing countries whose objectives were to bring attention to the problems of developing countries, in the wake of the changes affecting the latter.

Académie française: 1983–2001
He was elected a member of the Académie française on 2 June 1983, at the 16th seat where he succeeded Antoine de Lévis Mirepoix. He was the first African to sit at the Académie. The entrance ceremony in his honour took place on 29 March 1984, in presence of French President François Mitterrand. This was considered a further step towards greater openness in the Académie, after the previous election of a woman, Marguerite Yourcenar.

In 1993, the last and fifth book of the Liberté series was published: Liberté 5: le dialogue des cultures.

Personal life and death
Senghor's first marriage was to Ginette Éboué (1 March 1923 – 1992), daughter of Félix Éboué. They married on 9 September 1946 and divorced in 1955. They had two sons, Francis in 1947 and Guy in 1948. His second wife, Colette Hubert [fr] (20 November 1925 – 18 November 2019), who was from France, became Senegal's first First Lady upon independence in 1960. Senghor had three sons between his two marriages.

Senghor spent the last years of his life with his wife in Verson, near the city of Caen in Normandy, where he died on 20 December 2001. His funeral was held on 29 December 2001 in Dakar. Officials attending the ceremony included Raymond Forni, president of the Assemblée nationale and Charles Josselin, state secretary for the minister of foreign affairs, in charge of the Francophonie. Jacques Chirac (who said, upon hearing of Senghor's death: "Poetry has lost one of its masters, Senegal a statesman, Africa a visionary and France a friend") and Lionel Jospin, respectively president of the French Republic and the prime minister, did not attend. Their failure to attend Senghor's funeral made waves as it was deemed a lack of acknowledgement for what the politician had been in his life. The analogy was made with the Senegalese Tirailleurs who, after having contributed to the liberation of France, had to wait more than forty years to receive an equal pension (in terms of buying power) to their French counterparts. The scholar Érik Orsenna wrote in the newspaper Le Monde an editorial entitled "J'ai honte" (I am ashamed).

Legacy
Although a socialist, Senghor avoided the Marxist and anti-Western ideology that had become popular in post-colonial Africa, favouring the maintenance of close ties with France and the western world.

Senghor's tenure as president was characterised by the development of African socialism, which was created as an indigenous alternative to Marxism, drawing heavily from the négritude philosophy. In developing this, he was assisted by Ousmane Tanor Dieng. On 31 December 1980, he retired in favour of his prime minister, Abdou Diouf. Politically, Senghor's stamp can also be identified today. With regards to Senegal in particular, his willful abdication of power to his successor, Abdou Diouf, led to Diouf's peaceful leave from office as well. Senegal's special relationship to France and economic legacy are more highly contested, but Senghor's impact on democracy remains nonetheless. Senghor managed to retain his identity as both a poet and a politician even throughout his busy careers as both, living by his philosophy of achieving equilibrium between competing forces. Whether it was France and Africa, poetics and politics, or other disparate parts of his identity, Senghor balanced the two.

Literarily, Senghor's influence on political thought and poetic form are wide reaching even through to our modern day. Senghor's poetry endures as the "record of an individual sensibility at a particular moment in history," capturing the spirit of the Négritude movement at its peak, but also marks a definitive place in literary history. Senghor's thoughts were exceedingly radical for this time, arguing that Africans could only progress if they developed a culture distinct and separate from the colonial powers that oppressed them, pushing against popular thought at the time. Senghor was deeply influenced by poets from the US like Langston Hughes, and his work in turn resonates among today's young US population despite the generations that have passed.

Seat number 16 of the Académie was vacant after the Senegalese poet's death. He was ultimately replaced by another former president, Valéry Giscard d'Estaing.

Honours and awards

Senghor received several honours in the course of his life. He was made Grand-Croix of the Légion d'honneur, Grand-Croix of the l'Ordre national du Mérite, commander of arts and letters. He also received academic palms and the Grand Cross of the National Order of the Lion. His war exploits earned him the Reconnaissance Franco-alliée Medal of 1939–1945 and the Combattant Cross of 1939–1945. He received honorary doctorates from thirty-seven universities.

Senghor received the Commemorative Medal of the 2500th Anniversary of the founding of the Persian Empire on 14 October 1971.

On 13 November 1978, he was created a Knight of the Collar of the Order of Isabella the Catholic of Spain. Members of the order at the rank of Knight and above enjoy personal nobility and have the privilege of adding a golden heraldic mantle to their coats of arms. Those at the rank of the Collar also receive the official style "His or Her Most Excellent Lord".

That same year, Senghor received an honoris causa from the University of Salamanca.

In 1983 he was awarded the Dr. Leopold Lucas Prize by the University of Tübingen.

The Senghor French Language International University, named after him was officially opened in Alexandria in 1990.

In 1994 he was awarded the Lifetime Achievement Award by the African Studies Association; however, there was controversy about whether he met the standard of contributing "a lifetime record of outstanding scholarship in African studies and service to the Africanist community." Michael Mbabuike, president of the New York African Studies Association (NYASA), said that the award also honours those who have worked "to make the world a better place for mankind."

The airport of Dakar was renamed Aéroport International Léopold Sédar Senghor in 1996, on his 90th birthday.

The Passerelle Solférino in Paris was renamed after him in 2006, on the centenary of his birth.

Acknowledgement
 Member of the Académie française
 Member of the Académie des Sciences Morales et Politiques 
 Member of the Bayerische Akademie der Schönen Künste
 Member of the Royal Academy of Morocco
 Honorary Fellow of the Sahitya Akademi

Honorary degrees
 Paris-Sorbonne University
 Harvard University
 Yale University
 University of Oxford
 Université catholique de Louvain
 Université de Montréal
 Université Laval
 Goethe University Frankfurt
 University of Vienna
 University of Salzburg
 Paris Descartes University
 University of Bordeaux
 University of Strasbourg
 Nancy 2 University
 University of Padua
 University of Salamanca
 University of Évora
 Federal University of Bahia

Summary of Orders received

Senegalese national honours

Foreign honours

Poetry

His poetry was widely acclaimed, and in 1978 he was awarded the Prix mondial Cino Del Duca.
His poem "A l'appel de la race de Saba", published in 1936, was inspired by the entry of Italian troops in Addis Ababa.
In 1948, Senghor compiled and edited a volume of Francophone poetry called Anthologie de la nouvelle poésie nègre et malgache for which Jean-Paul Sartre wrote an introduction, entitled "Orphée Noir" (Black Orpheus).

For his epitaph was a poem he had written, namely:

Quand je serai mort, mes amis, couchez-moi sous Joal-l'Ombreuse.
Sur la colline au bord du Mamanguedy, près l'oreille du sanctuaire des Serpents.
Mais entre le Lion couchez-moi et l'aïeule Tening-Ndyae.
Quand je serai mort mes amis, couchez-moi sous Joal-la-Portugaise.
Des pierres du Fort vous ferez ma tombe, et les canons garderont le silence.
Deux lauriers roses-blanc et rose-embaumeront la Signare.

When I'm dead, my friends, place me below Shadowy Joal,
On the hill, by the bank of the Mamanguedy, near the ear of Serpents' Sanctuary.
But place me between the Lion and ancestral Tening-Ndyae.
When I'm dead, my friends, place me beneath Portuguese Joal.
Of stones from the Fort build my tomb, and cannons will keep quiet.
Two oleanders – white and pink – will perfume the Signare.

Négritude

With Aimé Césaire and Léon Damas, Senghor created the concept of Négritude, an important intellectual movement that sought to assert and to valorise what they believed to be distinctive African characteristics, values, and aesthetics. One of these African characteristics that Senghor theorised was asserted when he wrote "the Negro has reactions that are more lived, in the sense that they are more direct and concrete expressions of the sensation and of the stimulus, and so of the object itself with all its original qualities and power." This was a reaction against the too strong dominance of French culture in the colonies, and against the perception that Africa did not have culture developed enough to stand alongside that of Europe. In that respect négritude owes significantly to the pioneering work of Leo Frobenius.

Building upon historical research identifying ancient Egypt with black Africa, Senghor argued that sub-Saharan Africa and Europe are in fact part of the same cultural continuum, reaching from Egypt to classical Greece, through Rome to the European colonial powers of the modern age. Négritude was by no means—as it has in many quarters been perceived—an anti-white racism, but rather emphasised the importance of dialogue and exchange among different cultures (e.g., European, African, Arab, etc.).

A related concept later developed in Mobutu's Zaire is that of authenticité or Authenticity.

Décalage 
In colloquial French, the term décalage is used to describe jetlag, lag or a general discrepancy between two things. However, Senghor uses the term to describe the unevenness in the African Diaspora. The complete phrase he uses is "Il s'agit, en réalité, d'un simple décalage—dans le temps et dans l'espace", meaning that between Black Africans and African Americans there exists an inconsistency, both temporally and spatially. The time element points to the advancing or delaying of a schedule or agenda, while the space aspects designates the displacing and shifting of an object. The term points to "a bias that refuses to pass over when one crosses the water". He asks, how can we expect any sort of solidarity or intimacy from two populations that diverged over 500 years ago?

Works of Senghor
Prière aux masques (c. 1935 – published in collected works during the 1940s).
Chants d'ombre (1945)
Hosties noires (1948)
Anthologie de la nouvelle poésie nègre et malgache (1948)
La Belle Histoire de Leuk-le-Lièvre (1953)
Éthiopiques (1956)
Nocturnes (1961). (English tr. by Clive Wake and John O. Reed, Nocturnes, London: Heinemann Educational, 1969. African Writers Series 71)
Nation et voie africaine du socialisme (1961)
Pierre Teilhard de Chardin et la politique africaine (1962)
Poèmes (1964).
Lettres de d'hivernage (1973)
Élégies majeures (1979)
La Poésie de l'action: conversation avec Mohamed Aziza (1980)
Ce que je crois (1988)

See also

Serer people
List of Senegalese writers

References

Further reading
Armand Guibert & Seghers Nimrod (2006), Léopold Sédar Senghor, Paris (1961 edition by Armand Guibert).
Sources from this article were taken from the equivalent French article :fr:Léopold Sédar Senghor.

External links

 Biography and guide to collected works: African Studies Centre, Leiden
 Histoire des Signares de Gorée du 17ie au 19ie siécle. Poèmes de Léopold Sédar Senghor
 Biographie par l'Assemblée nationale
 Biographie par l'Academie française
 President Dia by William Mbaye (2012, english version) – Youtube – Political documentary – 1957 to 1963 in Senegal (55')
 Sangonet
 Préface par Léopold Sédar Senghor à l'ouvrage collectif sur Le Nouvel Ordre Économique Mondiale édité par Hans Köchler (1980) (facsimilé)
Semaine spéciale Senghor à l'occasion du centenaire de sa naissance
Texte sur le site de Sudlangues Mamadou Cissé, "De l'assimilation à l'appropriation: essai de glottopolitique senghorienne»
Page on the French National Assembly website
« Racisme? Non, mais Alliance Spirituelle »

1906 births
2001 deaths
People from Thiès Region
People of French West Africa
Senegalese Roman Catholics
Serer presidents
Presidents of Senegal
French Section of the Workers' International politicians
Senegalese Democratic Bloc politicians
Government ministers of France
Members of the Constituent Assembly of France (1945)
Members of the Constituent Assembly of France (1946)
Deputies of the 1st National Assembly of the French Fourth Republic
Deputies of the 2nd National Assembly of the French Fourth Republic
Deputies of the 3rd National Assembly of the French Fourth Republic
Deputies of the 1st National Assembly of the French Fifth Republic
Senegalese pan-Africanists
Senegalese politicians
Catholic socialists
Senegalese Christian socialists
National anthem writers
Senegalese poets
20th-century male writers
Prince des poètes
Prix Guillaume Apollinaire winners
Struga Poetry Evenings Golden Wreath laureates
Lycée Louis-le-Grand alumni
Member of the Academy of the Kingdom of Morocco
Members of the Académie Française
French Army officers
French Army personnel of World War II
French prisoners of war in World War II
French Resistance members
Recipients of the Order of Isabella the Catholic
Collars of the Order of Isabella the Catholic
Knights Grand Cross of the Order of Isabella the Catholic
20th-century Senegalese politicians
Recipients of orders, decorations, and medals of Senegal